Elmsvale is a rural community of the Halifax Regional Municipality in the Canadian province of Nova Scotia in the Musquodoboit Valley.

References
Explore HRM
Elmsvale  on Destination Nova Scotia

Communities in Halifax, Nova Scotia
General Service Areas in Nova Scotia